Mia Cox is a female singer-songwriter from Newark, New Jersey. She was the featured vocalist on DJ Disciple's "Caught Up" (from the Queer As Folk soundtrack), which went to number one on the Billboard Hot Dance Music/Club Play chart in 2002.

Compilations
Caught Up  (2000)

References

See also
List of number-one dance hits (United States)
List of artists who reached number one on the US Dance chart

Year of birth missing (living people)
Living people
American dance musicians
American house musicians
American women singers
Musicians from Newark, New Jersey
Singer-songwriters from New Jersey
American women in electronic music
21st-century American women
Singer-songwriters from New York (state)